Andy Kessler may refer to:

Andy Kessler (skateboarder), American skateboard pioneer
Andy Kessler (author), author of books on business, technology, and the health field